Extreme Couponing (renamed Extreme Couponing: All-Stars for its third season) is an American reality television entertainment series produced by Sharp Entertainment and aired on cable network TLC in the United States and Canada.

History
Extreme couponing is an activity that combines shopping skills with couponing in an attempt to save as much money as possible while accumulating the most groceries.  The concept of "extreme couponers" was first mentioned by The Wall Street Journal on March 8, 2010, in an article entitled "Hard Times Turn Coupon Clipping Into the Newest Extreme Sport". On March 25, 2010, ABC Nightline followed up with its Season 3 premiere with a segment entitled "Extreme Couponing Competition: How Far Can $50 Go?"

TLC's Extreme Couponing is a show about shoppers who make extensive and focused use of coupons to save money while accumulating large quantities of goods. It was previewed in December 2010; after surpassing network expectations with more than 2 million viewers, it received a series order and began regular airings in April 2011.

On June 6, 2011, TLC announced it ordered a second season of Extreme Couponing. It premiered on Wednesday, September 28, 2011.

The third season debuted on May 28, 2012.

On November 20, 2015, the show returned to Discovery Family, a sister network to TLC, and was renamed Greatest Givers: Extreme Couponing for its run during the Thanksgiving season.  It now runs regularly on Thursday nights on Discovery Family.

Reception
New York Times columnist Virginia Heffernan described the show as "a deceptively simple look at the complex drama of American spending and the paradoxes of parsimony." E! Onlines critic Jennifer Arrow called it a "recessionista series"  marked by "a lot of tawdry, exploitative 'reality and participants "just doing their crazy best to stretch dollars and provide a little more for their families."  Ken Tucker of Entertainment Weekly noted that the show "has elicited some extreme reactions", and called it "a canny example of two elements floating through the country right now," citing "a fascination with extreme behavior as it's filtered through reality TV" and "the fact that a lot of people don't have as much money as they used to."

The show has come under fire by consumer bloggers and experts such as Jill Cataldo about potential coupon misuse on the show.  Actions such as the use of coupons for incorrect items, using counterfeit coupons, and encouraging compulsive hoarding have been cited as reasons to question the show's authenticity.

Episodes

Series overview

Season 1 (2010–2011)

Season 2 (2011)

Season 3: All-Stars (2011–2012)
Shoppers compete in a reality series that features 12 of the best "Extreme Couponing" savers in 30-minute challenges to see who can save the most on $500 worth of merchandise, which is then donated to charity.

Season 4 (2012)

Season 5 (2012)

References

External links
 
 TVGuide.com
 ExtremeCouponing.com

2010 American television series debuts
2010s American reality television series
English-language television shows
TLC (TV network) original programming
2012 American television series endings